Littleville is a town located on the southern border of Colbert County, Alabama, United States, and extends into Franklin County. It is part of the Florence - Muscle Shoals Metropolitan Statistical Area known as "The Shoals". As of the 2010 census, the population of the town was 1,011.

History
The town was named for Captain Little, who kept a store there.

Geography
Littleville is located in southern Colbert County at  (34.590933, -87.675599). a small portion of the town extends into Franklin County to the south.

Demographics

2020 census

As of the 2020 United States census, there were 1,038 people, 364 households, and 287 families residing in the town.

2000 census
As of the census of 2000, there were 978 people, 395 households, and 297 families residing in the town. The racial makeup of the town was 98.57% White, 0.51% Native American, and 0.92% from two or more races. 0.82% of the population were Hispanic or Latino of any race.

There were 395 households, out of which 31.9% had children under the age of 18 living with them, 65.1% were married couples living together, 8.6% had a female householder with no husband present, and 24.6% were non-families. 21.8% of all households were made up of individuals, and 8.6% had someone living alone who was 65 years of age or older. The average household size was 2.48 and the average family size was 2.89.

In the town, the population was spread out, with 23.7% under the age of 18, 7.3% from 18 to 24, 30.5% from 25 to 44, 26.0% from 45 to 64, and 12.6% who were 65 years of age or older. The median age was 38 years. For every 100 females, there were 94.8 males. For every 100 females age 18 and over, there were 92.3 males.

The median income for a household in the town was $32,583, and the median income for a family was $35,913. Males had a median income of $31,852 versus $21,250 for females. The per capita income for the town was $14,372. About 11.1% of families and 13.1% of the population were below the poverty line, including 14.2% of those under age 18 and 16.1% of those age 65 or over.

References 

Towns in Colbert County, Alabama
Florence–Muscle Shoals metropolitan area
Towns in Alabama